Redcliffe Bridge may refer to:

 Redcliffe Bridge, Bristol, an opening bridge across Bristol Harbour in Bristol, England
 Redcliffe Bridge, Perth, a bridge across the Swan River in Perth, Western Australia
 Houghton Highway, a bridge connecting Brisbane and Redcliffe in Queensland, Australia